The U.S. Army Public Health Center (APHC) is a United States Army element headquartered at Aberdeen Proving Ground, Maryland, United States. As a forward operating agency of the United States Army Medical Command, APHC is responsible for providing technical support and expertise in the areas of preventive medicine, public health, health promotion, and wellness to military units around the globe.

Throughout the history of warfare, armies have depended on clean water, wholesome food, sanitation, disease and injury prevention, hazard-free environments and other sound public health practices to keep Soldiers in fighting form. The Army Public Health Center has broadened the scope of the public health mission to meet today's Army's needs: to enhance Army readiness by identifying and assessing current and emerging health threats; developing and communicating public health solutions; and assuring the quality and effectiveness of the Army's Public Health Enterprise.

John Resta serves as the director.

The Maryland Office of ORAU and the Oak Ridge Institute for Science and Education administers research participation programs for APHC.

History

Before 2015
The lineage of the APHC can be traced back more than 70 years to the Army Industrial Hygiene Laboratory, which was established in 1942 at the beginning of World War II under the direct jurisdiction of the Army surgeon general. AIHL originally was located at the Johns Hopkins School of Hygiene and Public Health; it had a staff of three and an annual budget of $3,000. Its mission was to conduct occupational health surveys and investigations within the Department of Defense industrial production base, a mission that proved beneficial to the nation's war effort. In October 1945, AIHL was transferred to what is now Aberdeen Proving Ground - South. From 1940 to 1960, AIHL's mission and personnel continued to expand, and AIHL became the U.S. Army Environmental Hygiene Agency (USAEHA) located at Edgewood Arsenal which was later merged with Aberdeen Proving Ground.  During the 1960s and early 1970s, AEHA provided a variety of public health services to all US-based Army installations, including water supply, water and air pollution control, industrial hygiene, and others.

In 1973, USAEHA became a subordinate command of the U.S. Army Health Services Command (the latter later became the United States Army Medical Command). The following year, USAEHA was given command of the health and environmental resources of the Army medical laboratories. These assets became USAEHA subordinate commands.

In 1994, USAEHA was re-designated as the United States Army Center for Health Promotion and Preventive Medicine. In addition to its continental United States regional commands, USACHPPM also had two subordinate commands. In 1995, USACHPPM Europe was activated in Landstuhl, Germany, and USACHPPM Pacific was activated, moving in 1997 to Camp Zama, Japan.

In 2010, the center was merged with the United States Army Veterinary Command (VETCOM) to form U.S. Army Public Health Command. VETCOM supported almost 500 DOD installations worldwide and included the DOD Veterinary Food Analysis and Diagnostic Laboratory and the DOD Military Working Dog Veterinary Service. Through this merger, a uniquely capable military organization was born—one that embodies the “One Health” approach to public health.

One Health is the concept that health in animals, people, and the environment is interrelated; that is, the health of each contributes to the health of all. The formal uniting of prevention, health promotion, and veterinary missions allowed for full coordination, synchronization, and integration of the military public health services around the globe.

USAPHC, inactivated on October 1, 2016, had six subordinate elements: the Army Institute for Health and five regional commands located at Fort George G. Meade in Maryland; Joint Base San Antonio in Texas; Joint Base Lewis-McChord in Washington; Landstuhl Regional Medical Center in Germany; and Camp Zama in Japan. USAPHC's mission was to promote health and prevent disease, injury, and disability of Soldiers and retirees, their Families, and Army civilians, and to provide veterinary medicine services for the Army and Department of Defense. USAPHC also provided consulting services to senior military leaders, commanders both deployed and in garrison, and military medical and health professionals.

U.S. Army Public Health Center

The APHC reached provisional status on August 17, 2015 and full operating capacity on October 1, 2016.

Headquartered at Aberdeen Proving Ground, Maryland, the APHC is a field operating activity of the U.S. Army Medical Command, but it is unique among MEDCOM organizations in these ways:
 Its “patients” are populations, that is groups of people—military units, their families, or Army civilian employees, for example—rather than individuals.
 It emphasizes prevention of disease, injury, and disability, rather than healing those who have already experienced these conditions.
 It is proactive, optimizing health by educating members of the Army population about healthy behaviors, empowering them to build and sustain their own good health.

Mission and Services
The APHC draws on a distinguished legacy to provide public health services to its Army and Department of Defense customers around the world. It standardizes and promulgates practices and procedures used throughout the public health enterprise, provides one-of-a-kind and reach-back technical capabilities, and oversees quality assurance of public health missions.

The organization completes an extensive amount of analytical support to global operations and is responsible for the collection and archival of all deployment occupational and environmental health surveillance data.

APHC personnel have expertise in a variety of fields. Their professions include almost 70 scientific and technical disciplines, which are brought to bear on public health issues and problems in matrixed teams.

The APHC continues to fulfill its mission of enhancing Army readiness and focusing on promoting healthy people, communities, animals and workplaces.

Criticism
In May, 2022 former Army Public Health Center Commander Lt. Mark Bashaw was convicted of violating orders to present a COVID-19 test to his superiors, to wear a mask indoors and to telework at the Aberdeen Proving Ground in Maryland. The presiding judge declined to sentence him. Bashaw was subsequently joined by senior officers of all branches of the military in notifying Congress on August 15 that the Department of Defense is engaging in illegal and fraudulent acts that are endangering Service members and their families, as well as the American public whom the DOD is charged with protecting.

References

External links
 APHC Home
 About APHC
 United States Army Medical Command
 APHC News Releases

United States Army medical installations
Health education in the United States
Health education organizations
Public